Como tú no hay dos may refer to:

Como tú no hay 2, a 2020 Spanish-language TV series originally written as Como tú no hay dos
Como tú no hay dos (song), a 2015 single by Thalía and Becky G